Långban is a mining area in Värmland in Sweden. It belongs to Filipstad Municipality, with the nearest city being Filipstad, 21 km south. It was systematically mined through 1711-1972, but has traces from the 15th century. It is the birthplace of Swedish-American inventor John Ericsson and his brother Nils Ericson.

It has been described as one of the most mineral-rich places in the world. Over 270 different minerals have been identified in the area and more than 60 of these have Långban as type locality. Most mining was done for iron ore and manganese ore, but  in total, 300 minerals have been found. After 1950, only dolomite was extracted.

Långbanshyttan is the name of an adjacent blast furnace and adjacent house of the factory manager, where the brothers Nils and John Ericsson were born. The furnace was built in the 16th century, and used until 1933. It was renovated 1980-83 and is today a tourist attraction.

External links 
 Långban and Långbanshyttan from Nordisk familjebok
 Langban at Mindat.org, List of minerals at Langban.

References

Populated places in Värmland County
Geological type localities